RATP Dev Transit London is a joint venture between RATP Dev and Kelsian Group in London. It owns the London bus companies of London Sovereign, London United and London Transit. It commenced on 11 December 2021 and mostly operates in West and South West London as well as some services into Central London.

History
In September 2021, RATP Dev and SeaLink Travel Group (now Kelsian Group) announced they had agreed to form a joint venture to combine some of their Transport for London contracted bus operations. RATP hold an 87.5% shareholding, with Kelsian owning 12.5%. RATP Dev Transit London (RDTL) commenced with 1,250 buses on 115 routes from 10 garages.

RDTL combined all of RATP's London Sovereign and London United operations, with both retaining their existing brands, while Tower Transit's operations out of Westbourne Park garage operate under the London Transit brand. RDTL trading commenced on 11 December 2021.

The RATP Group placed it's London operations under review in March 2023 after reporting a €26 million (£23.2 million) loss across the group's operations in 2022, with RATP announcing they were exploring proposals to sell or dilute their shareholding in RATP Dev Transit London. RATP's London operations have been impacted by a bus driver shortage, inflation and strike action resulting in a 10% pay increase compared to the initial 2.3% offered.

References

Companies based in London
RATP Group
Transport companies established in 2021
2021 establishments in England